Allan V. Campbell (born 21 May 1969) is a Canadian politician, who was elected to the Legislative Assembly of Prince Edward Island in the 2007 provincial election. He represented the electoral district of Souris-Elmira as a member of the Liberal Party.

He served in the Executive Council of Prince Edward Island as Minister of Fisheries and Aquaculture, and Minister of Innovation and Advanced Learning.

He was defeated in the 2011 provincial election by Colin LaVie and upon his defeat was appointed as Chief of Staff to the Premier of Prince Edward Island.

After completing his Bachelor of Business Administration at the University of Prince Edward Island, he purchased a fishing operation. He had a 15-year career in the fishery, and retired when he was appointed as Minister of Fisheries and Aquaculture.

References 

1969 births
Living people
Members of the Executive Council of Prince Edward Island
People from Souris, Prince Edward Island
Prince Edward Island Liberal Party MLAs
University of Prince Edward Island alumni
21st-century Canadian politicians